The Center for the Study of Capitalism (CSC) is a Guatemalan think tank and University Research Centre of Study founded in 2009 with the support of Universidad Francisco Marroquin. Its stated mission is "to promote discussion and reflection in order to encourage the adoption of a philosophy of life that leads a person to champion reason, individual rights, capitalism and entrepreneurial activity". CSC is a private, secular, coeducational, nonresidential, nonprofit center of study supported primarily by grants and contributions from foundations, corporations, and individuals. It is headquartered in Guatemala City, Guatemala

Personnel

Officers and trustees
CSC's current Executive Director is Adelaida Loukota (2011-to date). Its founder and former Executive Director is Guillermo Pineda (2009-2011).  The Centre is sponsored by Universidad Francisco Marroquin.

Research programs
CSC's research is divided upon socratic dialogue sessions with high school students and young entrepreneurs to study values as guides to excellence in thinking and action.  Their dialogues elaborate into six broad categories: economic history, philosophy, individual rights, political and public opinion studies, social and cultural studies, and legal and constitutional studies.  AEI scholars' research is presented at socratic dialogues, lectures, and colloquiums in Guatemala City, Guatemala.

See also
 Universidad Francisco Marroquin

References

External links
 CSC official website
 CSC's activities report 2011-2012
 Interview with Guillermo Pineda CSC's Executive Director (2009–11) by Prensa Libre, Guatemala's largest newspaper

Organizations established in 2009
2009 establishments in Guatemala